Trevon Tate (born March 13, 1996) is a professional gridiron football offensive tackle for the Toronto Argonauts of the Canadian Football League (CFL).

College career 
After using a redshirt season in 2014, Tate played college football for the Memphis Tigers from 2015 to 2018.

Professional career

Cleveland Browns 
Tate signed with the Cleveland Browns as an undrafted free agent on May 3, 2019. However, he was waived on May 28, 2019.

Hamilton Tiger-Cats 
On June 21, 2019, Tate signed a practice roster agreement with the Hamilton Tiger-Cats. He made his professional debut in the final game of the regular season on November 2, 2019, against the Toronto Argonauts. He did not play in 2020 due to the cancellation of the 2020 CFL season.

Tate started at left tackle in the first game of the 2021 season before being transferred to the injured list. He was then released on August 21, 2021.

Toronto Argonauts 
Shortly after his Hamilton release, Tate signed a practice roster agreement with the Toronto Argonauts on August 26, 2021.

Ottawa Redblacks 
Due to 2021 rules regarding possible pandemic limitations, the Ottawa Redblacks claimed Tate from Toronto's practice roster on September 19, 2021, to play for the team temporarily. He played at left tackle for the team's game against the Edmonton Elks on September 28, 2021, and then had his rights reverted back to the Argonauts shortly thereafter.

Toronto Argonauts (II)
After playing one game for the Redblacks, Tate re-joined the Argonauts on September 30, 2021. He played in four regular season games for the team to end the 2021 season, including against the Tiger-Cats and Redblacks, who he had played for earlier in the year.

Personal life 
Tate was born in Channelview, Texas to parents Paula Thomas-Smith and Gilbert Smith. He has two siblings, Melicia Terrell and LaKena Smith.

References

External links 
 Toronto Argonauts profile

1996 births
Living people
People from Harris County, Texas
Players of American football from Texas
Players of Canadian football from Texas
American football offensive linemen
Canadian football offensive linemen
Memphis Tigers football players
Cleveland Browns players
Hamilton Tiger-Cats players
Toronto Argonauts players
Ottawa Redblacks players